Lynda Bird Johnson Robb (born March 19, 1944) is the elder daughter of the 36th U.S. President Lyndon B. Johnson and former First Lady Lady Bird Johnson. She served as chairwoman of the Board of Reading is Fundamental, the nation's largest children's literacy organization, as well as chairwoman of the President's Advisory Committee for Women. She is a magazine editor who served as First Lady of Virginia from 1982 to 1986, and as Second Lady of Virginia from 1978 to 1982. She is the oldest living child of a U.S. president, following the death of John Eisenhower on December 21, 2013.

Biography

When Lynda Bird Johnson was born, her mother Lady Bird had suffered three miscarriages and her doctor spoke pessimistically of her chances of having any more children, so her father suggested that she be named for both her parents. Thus, the name "Lynda Bird".

Johnson was engaged to Bernard Rosenbach before she met the actor George Hamilton, who himself had been engaged to Susan Kohner. In 1966, Johnson and Hamilton began dating. Because of an increase in Secret Service protection of Presidential relatives resulting from the assassination of John F. Kennedy, the Hamilton-Johnson couple was one of the first to be protected by Secret Service agents.

Johnson later married U.S. Marine Corps Captain Charles S. Robb, son of Frances Howard (Woolley) and James Spittal Robb, in the East Room of the White House in 1967 in a service celebrated by the Right Reverend Gerald Nicholas McAllister. Her husband served with distinction in Vietnam. Charles Robb was later elected Lieutenant Governor of Virginia (1978–1982), Governor of Virginia (1982–1986), and US Senator from Virginia (1989–2001).

On May 9, 1979, President Jimmy Carter appointed Lynda Bird Johnson Robb to chair the President's Advisory Committee for Women. The committee of 30 worked to carry out Carter's mandate to promote equality for women in the cultural, social, economic, and political life of the United States.

Robb served as chairwoman of the board of Reading is Fundamental (1996–2001), the nation's largest children's literacy organization. She continues to serve the organization as Chairwoman Emerita. She was a contributing editor to Ladies Home Journal magazine (1969–81). She serves on the board of directors of the Lyndon Baines Johnson Foundation and the Lady Bird Johnson Wildflower Center.

Robb was educated at the National Cathedral School for Girls, graduated from the University of Texas at Austin, and was a member of Zeta Tau Alpha sorority. She also briefly attended Mercy College. She holds an Honorary Doctor of Humane Letters from Washington and Lee University and Norwich University and has been honored with a plethora of civic awards for her public service.

She has three daughters, Lucinda Desha Robb (born 1968), Catherine Lewis Robb (born 1970) and Jennifer Wickliffe Robb (born 1978).

In 2004, Robb attended the state funeral of President Ronald Reagan, on behalf of her mother, who was unable to attend because of poor health. She again represented her mother at the state funeral of President Gerald Ford, who died December 26, 2006. In 2018, Robb attended the state funeral of George H. W. Bush alongside her husband Charles Robb, her sister Luci Baines Johnson and her brother-in-law Ian Turpin.

References

External links

1944 births
20th-century American women
21st-century American women
Living people
Children of presidents of the United States
Children of vice presidents of the United States
First Ladies and Gentlemen of Virginia
University of Texas at Austin alumni
Lyndon B. Johnson family
Norwich University alumni
Texas Democrats
Virginia Democrats
National Cathedral School alumni
Mercy College (New York) alumni
Writers from Washington, D.C.
20th-century American people